Obsidian Theatre Company is a Canadian professional theatre company that specializes in works by Black Canadian artists.  The company is located in Toronto, Ontario. The declared mandate of the company is a threefold mission: to produce plays, to develop playwrights and to train theatre professionals. Obsidian is dedicated to the exploration, development, and production of the Black voice. They produce plays from a world-wide canon focusing primarily, but not exclusively, on the works of highly acclaimed Black playwrights. Obsidian provides artistic support, promoting the development of work by Black theatre makers and offering training opportunities through mentoring and apprenticeship programs for emerging Black artists.

History 

Founded in February 2000, Obsidian Theatre Company has grown into a large independent theatre company with a full schedule of productions, playwright/play development and professional training programs. Since the company's inception, Obsidian has worked to change the profile of culturally diverse theatre in Canada by encouraging companies to re-evaluate the way artists of colour are involved in the work. The company does not manage its own physical theatre and rather partners with other theatre companies to produce works.

In 2021, the theatre created the web series 21 Black Futures for CBC Gem.

People

Founding members 

Awaovieyi Agie 
Ardon Bess 
David Collins 
Roy Lewis 
Yanna McIntosh 
Diane Roberts
Kim Roberts 
Sandi Ross 
Djanet Sears
Satori Shakoor
Tricia Williams 
Alison Sealy-Smith
Philip Akin

Board of directors 

Harmony Cohen - Chair
Walter Gibbons - Treasurer
Arlene Campbell - Secretary
Ashima Chopra- Director
Sascha Cole - Director
Kevin Hanchard- Director
Greg Holness - Director
Stacey Norton - Director
Bev Salmon- Director

Staff 

Philip Akin - Artistic Director (2005-2020); Mumbi Tindyebwa Otu (2020-) 
Michael Sinclair - General Manager
Luke Reece - Producer
Myekah Payne - Company Dramaturge

Playwrights Unit 

An integral part of the company is the Obsidian Playwrights Unit, a venue for exploration of ideas.

Playwrights commit to monthly meetings over a yearlong period (September to June). The group is headed by the Play Development Coordinator and is focused on playwright development as opposed to full-length play creation. This allows for each playwright to work on a short piece for workshop production and also explores a number of philosophical ideas that stimulate ideas and conversation.

In June, the playwrights are matched with three directors to work on staging the plays for a workshop production, culminating in a Performance showcase.

Awards 

 2019 Dora Mavor Moore Award for Outstanding Production (School Girls; Or, The African Mean Girls Play)
 2012 Dora Mavor Moore Award for  Outstanding Production (Topdog/Underdog)
 2012 Dora Mavor Moore Award for Outstanding Production (in partnership with Acting Up Stage Company) (Caroline, or Change)

References

External links 
 Obsidian Theatre
 Obsidian Theatre archives (F0555) held at Clara Thomas Archives & Special Collections, York University Libraries, Toronto, Ontario.

Theatre companies in Toronto
Black Canadian culture in Toronto
Black theatre
2000 establishments in Ontario